The ambassador of the United Kingdom to Argentina is the United Kingdom's foremost diplomatic representative in Argentina, and head of the UK's diplomatic mission there.  The official title is His Britannic Majesty's Ambassador to the Argentine Republic.

From 1853, when the United Kingdom and the Republic of Paraguay established diplomatic relations, until 1941 the British Minister or Ambassador to Argentina was usually also accredited to Paraguay. Since 1941 a British Minister or Ambassador has been resident in Paraguay.

Heads of mission

Minister Plenipotentiary to the United Provinces of Rio de la Plata
1824–1826: Woodbine Parish, Consul-General; Chargé d'Affaires from 1825
1826–1828: Lord Ponsonby, Envoy Extraordinary and Minister Plenipotentiary
1828–1831: Woodbine Parish, Chargé d'Affaires
1831–1832: Henry Stephen Fox (appointed 1828)
1832–1834: Philip Yorke Gore (secretary of legation), Chargé d'Affaires
1834–1835: Hamilton Charles James Hamilton (appointed 1832)
1835–1844: John Mandeville

Minister Plenipotentiary to the Argentine Confederation
1844–1845: William Gore Ouseley
1845–1847: Relations suspended
1847 (May–June): Lord Howden (minister to Brazil), special mission jointly with Count Walewski of France
1847–1848: Relations suspended
1848–1851: Henry Southern
1851–1854: Captain Robert Gore, Chargé d'Affaires and Consul-General
1854–1859: William Christie, Chargé d'Affaires and Consul-General from 1854, Minister Plenipotentiary from 1856
1859–1865: Edward Thornton

Minister Plenipotentiary to the Argentine Republic
1865–1866: Richard Edwardes appointed but did not proceed
1866–1867: George Buckley Mathew
1867–1868: William Lowther
1868–1872: William Stuart

Envoy Extraordinary and Minister Plenipotentiary to the Argentine Republic
1872–1878: Lionel Sackville-West
1878–1879: Clare Ford
1879–1881: Sir Horace Rumbold, 8th Baronet
1881–1884: George Petre
1884–1885: Edmund Monson
1885–1896: Francis Pakenham
1896–1902: William Barrington
1902–1906: William Haggard (also Minister Plenipotentiary to Paraguay)
1906–1910: Walter Townley
1910–1919: Sir Reginald Tower
1919–1922: Ronald Macleay
1923–1925: Sir Beilby Alston
1925–1927: Sir Malcolm Robertson

Ambassador Extraordinary and Plenipotentiary to the Argentine Republic
1927–1929: Sir Malcolm Robertson
1930–1933: Sir Ronald Macleay
1933–1935: Sir Henry Chilton
1935–1937: Sir Nevile Henderson
1937–1942: Sir Esmond Ovey
1942–1946: David Victor Kelly (withdrawn for consultations 8 July 1944 – 25 April 1945)
1946–1948: Sir Reginald Leeper
1948–1952: Sir John Balfour
1951–1955: Sir Henry Mack
1955–1957: Sir Francis Evans
1957–1961: Sir John Ward
1961–1964: Sir George Middleton
1964–1969: Sir Michael Creswell
1969–1972: Sir Michael Hadow
1973–1975: Sir Donald Hopson
1975–1977: Sir Derrick Ashe
1980–1982: Anthony Williams

From 1982 to 1990, following the Falklands War, there were no diplomatic relations between the UK and Argentina. There was no Ambassador, but the embassy building remained open, as the British Interest Section of the Swiss Embassy, rather than as the British Embassy. The Argentine Embassy in London came under the Brazilian flag during the same period. Diplomatic relations were restored in 1990.

1990–1993: Humphrey Maud
1994–1997: Sir Peter Hall
1997–2000: William Marsden
2000–2004: Robin Christopher
2004–2008: John Hughes
2008–2012: Shan Morgan
2012–2016: John Freeman
2016–: Mark Kent

2021–: Kirsty Hayes

References

External links
UK and Argentina, gov.uk

Argentina
 
United Kingdom